Dew Drop Inn may refer to:

Dew Drop Inn (New Orleans, Louisiana)
Dew Drop Inn (Mountain View, Arkansas)
Dew Drop Inn (musical), 1923 Broadway musical